New Edinburg is an unincorporated census-designated place in Cleveland County, Arkansas, United States. Per the 2020 census, the population was 134.

Geography
Arkansas Highway 8 passes through the community, leading northwest  to Fordyce and southeast  to Warren.

Demographics

2020 census

Note: the US Census treats Hispanic/Latino as an ethnic category. This table excludes Latinos from the racial categories and assigns them to a separate category. Hispanics/Latinos can be of any race.

History
At the time the first Toledo courthouse burned down in 1889, New Edinburg had a population of 200. The unincorporated area was in the running to receive the county seat along with Rison, Kingsland, and Beasley's Switch. None of the towns managed to get a majority vote, so a second election was held. Rison won the county seat and it remains the seat today.

According to Arkansas Preservation, in the late 1800s, W. D. Attwood built a Queen Anne Classic-style residence in New Edinburg. Attwood was a town merchant and built the first brick store, the Attwood Mercantile Store. The location of Attwood's store is now the home of McClellan's Country Store, the only mercantile establishment in New Edinburg. In 1917, Emmett Moseley altered Attwood's house to its current appearance. The building is still a private residence, and in 1994 it was added to the National Register of Historic Places.

New Edinburg is the location of, or the nearest community to, three historic sites listed on the National Register of Historic Places:

Attwood-Hopson House, on the north side of Arkansas Highway 8
Barnett-Attwood House, northeast of New Edinburg
New Edinburg Commercial Historic District, on Arkansas Highway 8

In popular culture
In the fall of 2011, part of the feature film Come Morning was filmed in New Edinburg. According to IMDb, Come Morning is the only production to have ever filmed there.

Education
It is within the Cleveland County School District.

On July 1, 1985 the New Edinburg School District consolidated into the Kingsland School District. On July 1, 2004 the school district consolidated with the Rison School District to form the Cleveland County School District.

References

Census-designated places in Cleveland County, Arkansas
Census-designated places in Pine Bluff metropolitan area
Census-designated places in Arkansas